Yuexiu Fortune Center Tower 1 is a supertall skyscraper in Wuhan, Hubei, China. Construction began in 2012 and the building was completed in 2017. The tower is the tallest building in a complex which includes an additional 8 residential towers and a shopping mall.

See also
 List of tallest buildings in Wuhan
 List of tallest buildings in China

References

Skyscraper office buildings in Wuhan